Esencial is Christian Chávez's second album and first live. It was released on August 14, 2012, and was recorded during a live performance at Carioca Club in São Paulo, Brazil on January 17, 2012.  A DVD version of the concert was scheduled to be released in late 2012. The album was produced and arranged by Tiago D'Errico.

"Esencial" features remakes of several of Chávez's more famous songs including "Y Si No Ves" and "Tu Amor" which was written by Diane Warren and released when Chávez was a part of Latin pop sensation RBD.  His single "¿En Donde Estas?" has been remade into a duet with Indonesian singer and actress Agnes Monica.  The song is sung in three languages: English, Spanish, and Indonesian.

"Sacrilegio", written by Chavez and Claudia Brant, was released as an EP on May 22, 2012  and is included as a track on "Esencial". People magazine said the song "...marks the return of Christian Chavez"

Other notable tracks on the album include "No Me Olvides" written for Chávez by his friend, singer/songwriter Juan Gabriel.

Track listing

References

2012 albums
Christian Chávez albums